is a Japanese television variety show produced by TV Tokyo. The show challenges competitors with various talents in an array of tasks in order to crown one "King" of their ability. Episodes have focused on talents like Origami, Lego, Disney, and cooking fake food. TV Champion premiered on 16 April 1992 (20:00-21:00) as a 1-hour show, but was extended to a 90-minute format in 1993 (19:30-21:00). And change format to TV Champion 2 in 2006 by running 1 hour.

Video games

External links
 

Japanese variety television shows
1992 Japanese television series debuts
2008 Japanese television series endings
1990s Japanese television series
2000s Japanese television series
TV Tokyo original programming